Matthews is a census-designated place and unincorporated community in Jefferson County, Georgia, United States. Its population was 146 as of the 2020 census. Georgia State Route 88 passes through the community.

Demographics

References

Census-designated places in Georgia (U.S. state)
Unincorporated communities in Jefferson County, Georgia
Unincorporated communities in Georgia (U.S. state)